Route 337 is a Quebec provincial highway situated in the Lanaudière region. It runs from the junctions of Autoroute 25 and Route 344 in Terrebonne (north of Laval and Montreal) and ends in Saint-Jean-de-Matha at Route 131. It overlaps Route 335 and Route 158 near Saint-Lin–Laurentides as well as Route 125 in Sainte-Julienne, Route 341 and Route 348 in Rawdon and Route 343 in Saint-Alphonse-Rodriguez.

Municipalities along Route 337

 Terrebonne - (Terrebonne / La Plaine)
 Mascouche
 Saint-Lin–Laurentides
 Sainte-Julienne
 Rawdon
 Saint-Alphonse-Rodriguez
 Sainte-Béatrix
 Saint-Jean-de-Matha

See also
 List of Quebec provincial highways

References

External links  
 Transports Quebec Official Map 
 Route 337 on Google Maps

337
Roads in Lanaudière
Transport in Terrebonne, Quebec